The 1965–66 season was Stoke City's 59th season in the Football League and the 35th in the First Division.

Stoke had an inconsistent season as they found themselves being able to score a good number of goals but at the same time conceded many as well, scoring 65 goals and conceding 64. Stoke's final league position in 1965–66 was 10th, a modest improvement on the previous campaign.

Season review

League
The manager, chairman, directors and the supporters, all seemed happy with the squad for the 1965–66 season. But problems arose in defence as they started to concede a worrying number of goals with West Bromwich Albion hitting six while Burnley, Nottingham Forest, Sheffield Wednesday all put four past a leaky Stoke defence. However Stoke were also scoring an equal number of goals themselves as Northampton Town were beaten 6–2 with Ritchie again scoring four goals. Stoke finished the season in a respectable position of 10th. At the end of the season both Jimmy McIlroy and Bill Asprey left the club after having a good careers at the Victoria Ground. The 1965–66 season also saw the introduction of the substitute, Stoke's first sub being Keith Bebbington.

Tony Waddington tried to sign Swedish international Sven-Gunnar Larsson early in the season and actually played him in a friendly against Dynamo Moscow, but permission was denied by the FA and Stoke were fined £100.

FA Cup
Stoke were drawn at home to Third Division side Walsall in the third round and were to shock Stoke with a 2–0 win. Bobby Irvine played in the match and a produced a woeful performance and his mistake cost Stoke the match and also his Stoke career as he never played for the club again.

League Cup
Stoke went out of this season's League Cup in the fourth round losing 2–1 away at Burnley after knocking out both Norwich City and Chesterfield.

Final league table

Results

Stoke's score comes first

Legend

Football League First Division

FA Cup

League Cup

Friendlies

Squad statistics

References

Stoke City F.C. seasons
Stoke